Mark MacDonald may refer to:

 Mark MacDonald (bishop), former Anglican bishop of the Anglican Church of Canada, previously of the Episcopal Church (United States)
 Mark MacDonald (Vermont politician), Member of the Vermont Senate and former member of the Vermont House of Representatives
 Mark Macdonald, American diet, fitness and health expert

See also
 Mark McDonald (disambiguation)